Kuwait Medical Association was founded in October 1963. It is an establishment which provides and represents all doctors in Kuwait. The Kuwait Medical Association headquarters are in the Kuwait Medical Professionals building. It is located in Jabriya very close to the Kuwait Central Blood Bank.

The Kuwait Medical Association is part of the larger Kuwait Medical Professionals organisation, which includes two other associations: The Kuwait Pharmaceutical Association and the Kuwait Dental Association.

References

External links
 Official website

1963 establishments in Kuwait
Organizations established in 1963
Medical and health organizations based in Kuwait